The 1919 Far Eastern Games was the fourth edition of the regional multi-sport event, contested between China, Japan and the Philippines, and was held from 12 to 16 May 1919 in Manila, the Philippines. A total of eight sports were contested over the course of the five-day event.

In the football competition, China was represented by South China AA, a Hong Kong-based team.

Participating nations

Sports

References

Far Eastern Championship Games
Far Eastern Championship Games
Far Eastern Championship Games
Far Eastern Championship Games
International sports competitions hosted by the Philippines
Multi-sport events in the Philippines
Sports competitions in Manila
20th century in Manila
Far Eastern Championship Games